Wentang may refer to the following locations in China:

 Wentang, Hebei (温塘镇), town in Pingshan County
 Wentang, Xinhua County (温塘镇), town in Hunan
 Wentang, Zhangjiajie (温塘镇), town in Yongding District, Zhangjiajie, Hunan
 Wentang, Jiangxi (温汤镇), town in Yuanzhou District